Damon George Tunnicliff (August 20, 1829 – December 20, 1901) was an American jurist. He briefly served as a justice of the Illinois Supreme Court in 1885.

Biography
Damon G. Tunnicliff was born in Herkimer County, New York. At age fifteen, he went to live with his uncle in Cleveland, and in 1849, he moved to Vermont, Illinois to run a store for his cousin.

After successfully acting as his own attorney in trials for two traffic offenses there, he read law at a firm in Rushville, and was admitted to the bar in April 1853. He began practicing law in Macomb, Illinois in 1854, and later that year he became an attorney for the Northern Cross Railroad. He remained in that position for 47 years.

He married Mary Elizabeth Bailey on January 11, 1855, and they had six children. She died in 1865, and he remarried to Sarah Alice Bacon on November 4, 1868. They had three daughters: lawyer and law historian Helen Tunnicliff Catterall, clubwoman and reformer Sarah Bacon Tunnicliff, and medical researcher Ruth May Tunnicliff.

From February to June 1885, Tunnicliff served as a justice on the Supreme Court of Illinois.

He died in Macomb on December 20, 1901.

Notes

1829 births
1901 deaths
People from Herkimer County, New York
People from Macomb, Illinois
Justices of the Illinois Supreme Court
19th-century American judges